GLE may refer to:

 Gainesville station (Texas), an Amtrak station
 Gainesville Municipal Airport, in Texas, United States
 .gle top-level Google abbreviation domain
 Gleneagles railway station, in Scotland
 Irish language (ISO 639-2 code gle)
 Graphics Layout Engine, a computer programming language
 Mercedes-Benz GLE-Class, a model of sport utility vehicle 
 Gold-leaf electroscope, a scientific instrument developed in 1787 by British clergyman and physicist Abraham Bennet
 Ground level enhancement, a type of Solar particle event.